Greipstad is a former municipality in the old Vest-Agder county, Norway.  The  municipality existed from 1913 until its dissolution in 1964 when it became part of Songdalen municipality.  The administrative centre of the municipality was the village of Nodeland where the Greipstad Church is located. The municipality is located in the northern part of the present-day municipality of Kristiansand in Agder county.

History
The municipality of Greipstad was established on 1 July 1913 when it was separated from the municipality of Søgne to form a municipality of its own. Initially, the municipality had a population of 822 residents. During the 1960s, there were many municipal mergers across Norway due to the work of the Schei Committee.  On 1 January 1964, the municipality of Greipstad (population: 2,061) was dissolved and it was merged with most of the neighboring municipality of Finsland, excluding the area around Kleveland bru, (population: 797) and with the Eikeland area of Øvrebø municipality (population: 39) to form the new municipality of Songdalen.

Name
The municipality (originally the parish) is named after the old Greipstad farm, since that was the site of Greipstad Church. The first element of the name comes from the male name, Greipr, and the last element is stad which means "place".

Government
All municipalities in Norway, including Greipstad, are responsible for primary education (through 10th grade), outpatient health services, senior citizen services, unemployment and other social services, zoning, economic development, and municipal roads.  The municipality was governed by a municipal council of elected representatives, which in turn elected a mayor.

Municipal council
The municipal council  of Greipstad was made up of representatives that were elected to four year terms.  The party breakdown of the final municipal council was as follows:

See also
List of former municipalities of Norway

References

External links
Weather information for Greipstad 

Songdalen
Former municipalities of Norway
1913 establishments in Norway
1964 disestablishments in Norway